This is an index to deities of the different religions, cultures and mythologies of the world, listed by region or culture.

Africa

North Africa
Berber mythology
Egyptian deities
Guanche deities

Sub-Saharan Africa
African deities
Alusi
Yoruba deities
Afro-American religion
Loa
Orisha

Asia

Caucasus
Armenian deities
Georgian deities
Vainakh deities

Central Asia
Turkic deities

East Asia
Chinese deities
 Taoist pure ones
Japanese deities
Korean deities

North Asia
Siberian deities

South Asia

Hindu deities 
Rigvedic deities (see also Proto-Indo-Iranian religion)
Sri Lankan Tamil local deities
Tamil Nadu local deities
Buddhas
Buddhist Bodhisattvas
Tirthankara

Southeast Asia
Indonesian deities
Manipuri deities
King of Gods in Manipuri mythology
King of Serpent deities in Manipuri mythology
Ancestral deities of Manipur
Philippine deities

West Asia
Anatolia
Hittite deities
Hurrian deities
Lydian deities
Middle East  
Mesopotamian deities
Sumerian deities
Assyro-Babylonian pantheon (see also Family tree of the Babylonian gods)
Kassite deities
Ugaritic deities
Semitic gods
Canaanite deities
 Elohim in Abrahamic religions
Pre-Islamic Arabian deities
Jinn
Nabataean deities
Persia
Yazata, see also Proto-Indo-Iranian religion
Elam

Americas

Central America
Aztec deities
Maya deities

North America
Inuit deities
Native American deities

South America
Incan deities
Guarani
Mapuche
Muisca

Europe
Baltic deities
Latvian deities
Lithuanian deities
Celtic deities
Irish deities
Etruscan deities
Finnic deities
Germanic deities
Anglo-Saxon deities 
List of Norse gods and goddesses
Greek deities  (see also List of Greek mythological figures, Twelve Olympians, Greek hero cult, Family tree of the Greek gods, Mycenaean gods, Hellenismos)
Neoplatonic triad
Hungarian deities
Lusitani deities 
Paleo-Balkanic deities (Dacian/Illyrian/Thracian)
Patron saints
List of Roman deities
Sami deities
Slavic deities
 Thelemic deities

Oceania
Australian Aboriginal deities
Polynesian deities
Hawaiian deities
Māori deities of New Zealand
Rapa Nui deities of Easter Island

References

 Cultural sphere